Vereinigung may refer to:

Astronomische Vereinigung Kärntens, the Carinthian Astronomical Association
Deutsche Vereinigung des Gas- und Wasserfaches, the German association for gas and water
Flugwissenschaftliche Vereinigung Aachen, Flight Research Association Aachen
Hochkirchliche Vereinigung Augsburgischen Bekenntnisses, High Church Union of the Augsburg Confession
The Internationale Hegel-Vereinigung, International Hegel Association
Vereinigung der Buchantiquare und Kupferstichhändler in der Schweiz, the antiquarian booksellers association of Switzerland